The 2011 AFL season was the 115th season of the Australian Football League (AFL), the highest level senior Australian rules football competition in Australia, which was known as the Victorian Football League until 1989.

The season featured seventeen clubs, with the newly established Gold Coast Suns, based in Gold Coast, Queensland, playing its inaugural season. The season ran from 24 March until 1 October, and comprised a 22-game home-and-away season followed by a finals series featuring the top eight clubs.

The premiership was won by the Geelong Football Club for the ninth time, after it defeated  by 38 points in the 2011 AFL Grand Final.

Pre-season

Draft

The 2010 National Draft was held on 18 November 2010 at the Gold Coast Convention Centre. 107 players were drafted, including 28 promoted rookies. New club  received the first three selections as part of its draft concessions, and selected David Swallow with the number one draft pick.

The 2011 Pre-season and Rookie Drafts were held on 7 December 2010, with another 80 players being selected. , set to join the AFL as a senior club in 2012, had the first eight selections in the Rookie Draft as part of its draft concessions.

NAB Cup

The first round of matches featured lightning football matches played among six pools of three teams; standard matches were played for the rest of the competition. Collingwood defeated Essendon in the Grand Final at Etihad Stadium on Friday, 11 March.

Premiership season
The fixture was announced on 29 October. Some of the highlights included:
 had a bye for the first round and played its first home match in the second round against  at the Gabba. Its first match at its permanent home ground, the renovated Metricon Stadium, was against  on 28 May.
The season had 24 rounds; 19 rounds featured eight matches with one team having a bye, and five rounds featured seven matches with three teams having a bye. There were eleven additional matches compared with 2010, giving a total of 196 games including finals, up from 185.
Two venues hosted their first AFL matches during the season: Cazaly's Stadium in Cairns hosted the  vs  match in round 17, and the Adelaide Oval in Adelaide hosted the  vs  match in round 24; the latter was not part of the original fixture, and the game was moved there from AAMI Stadium during the season.

Round 1

Round 2

Round 3

Round 4

Round 5

Round 6

Round 7

Round 8

Round 9

Round 10

Round 11

Round 12

Round 13

Round 14

Round 15

Round 16

Round 17

Round 18

Round 19

Round 20

Round 21

Round 22

Round 23

Round 24

Win/loss table

Bold – Home game
X – Bye
Opponent for round listed above margin

Ladder

Ladder progression

Finals series

Week one

Week two

Week three

Week four

Awards
The AFL Players Association Awards were as follows:
The AFL Coaches Association Awards were as follows:

Best and fairest

Notable events and controversies

Betting scandals
The issue of betting became prominent during the 2011 season. The previous few years had seen other sports compromised by major spot-fixing scandals – most notably the Pakistan cricket spot-fixing controversy – so the issue was already well publicised at the time. The AFL had in place a strict policy prohibiting anyone involved in the AFL from placing any bet on any AFL outcome.

Early in the season, it emerged that there were several suspicious plunges on players who were usually defenders to kick the first goal of a match; in each case, the player unexpectedly started in the forward-line, indicating that the plunges may have been caused by team information somehow leaking to punters. Five suspicious plunges on defenders for the first goal were identified during the season:
Round 7,  vs  – Hawthorn midfielder/defender Brent Guerra
Round 7,  vs  – Brisbane defender Daniel Merrett
Round 8,  vs  – Brisbane defender Matt Maguire
Round 9,  vs  – Collingwood defender Nick Maxwell
Round 24,  vs  – Gold Coast defender Nathan Bock
Nathan Bock was the only of the five players to kick the first goal of his respective match. The cases all raised concerns about "exotic bets" and the risk of spot-fixing, although in no case was a deliberate attempt at spot-fixing ever implicated.

The controversy deepened prior to round 17, when the investigation into the Maxwell plunge revealed that Heath Shaw was implicated in bets placed on Maxwell's first goal. Shaw and a friend from outside the Collingwood Football Club were found to have placed a shared $20 bet on Maxwell for first goal at a TAB venue, using Shaw's knowledge from team meetings that Maxwell would be starting forward; that friend had later placed two more bets on Maxwell worth $15, shared with another friend. Shaw was penalised by the league under the anti-gambling code, receiving a suspension of eight matches, with a further suspended sentence of six matches, and was fined $20,000.

In their respective investigations, it was found that both Nick Maxwell and Nathan Bock had informed family members and friends that they would be starting in the forward-line before their respective plunges, and, unbeknownst to the players, those family members and friends then placed bets. Maxwell was fined $5,000, with a further suspended fine of $5,000, and Bock was fined $10,000 and suspended for two matches.

Following round 24,  assistant coach Dean Wallis was found to have placed three separate FootyQuad bets worth a total of $400 during the latter half of the season, one of which included a leg which involved an Essendon match. Wallis was fined $7,500, and suspended for fourteen matches (the suspension prevents him from participating on match-day, and from interacting directly with his players during training, until the suspension is complete).

Club leadership

Umpiring and rule changes
 The AFL introduced a new interchange rule. The standard interchange system was reduced from four players to three players. A fourth player is named as a substitute, and begins the game wearing a green vest. The substitute can be brought on at any point in the game, permanently replacing any player on the bench or the field. The player being replaced must wear a red vest when leaving the ground. This rule was predominantly introduced to keep the number of players able to participate in the game for each team equal, even if a severe injury occurs.
 The rules for calling "advantage" after a free kick were amended, to allow the players, rather than the umpires, make the decision on whether or not they see an advantage in continuous play.

Club membership

Coach changes

Club overviews

2011 Adelaide Football Club season
2011 Brisbane Lions season
2011 Carlton Football Club season
2011 Collingwood Football Club season
2011 Essendon Football Club season
2011 Fremantle Football Club season
2011 Geelong Football Club season
2011 Gold Coast Football Club season
2011 Hawthorn Football Club season
2011 Melbourne Football Club season
2011 Port Adelaide Football Club season
2011 Richmond Football Club season
2011 St Kilda Football Club season
2011 West Coast Eagles season
2011 Western Bulldogs season

References

Australian Football League seasons
 
2011 in Australian rules football